Viničani is a village in the municipality of Gradsko, North Macedonia.

Demographics
According to the 2002 census, the village had a total of 569 inhabitants. Ethnic groups in the village include:

Macedonians 487
Turks 22
Serbs 1
Bosniaks 58
Others 1

References

Villages in Gradsko Municipality